Ameiva tobagana, also known as the Antillean ameiva, is a species of teiid lizard found in Grenada and St. Vincent.

References

Ameiva
Reptiles described in 1879
Taxa named by Edward Drinker Cope